Lavrentios Alexanidis (born 11 September 1978 in Kvemo Kenti, Georgia) is a Greek judoka.

Achievements

References

External links
 
 
 

 

1978 births
Living people
Greek male judoka
Judoka at the 2004 Summer Olympics
Judoka at the 2008 Summer Olympics
Olympic judoka of Greece
21st-century Greek people